Jecheon Stadium is a multi-purpose stadium in Jecheon, South Korea.  It is currently used mostly for football matches. The stadium has a capacity of 25,000 people and was built in 1988.

External links
 World Stadiums

Sports venues in South Korea
Football venues in South Korea
Multi-purpose stadiums in South Korea
Jecheon
Sport in North Chungcheong Province
Buildings and structures in North Chungcheong Province